Chords Of Fame was a 2-LP compilation of folksinger Phil Ochs' career, compiled by his brother shortly after Ochs' death in 1976. Released on A&M Records, it compiled tracks Ochs had recorded for both that label and Elektra Records. The compilation included several rarities:
An electric version of "I Ain't Marching Anymore", released as a single in the UK in 1966
Both sides of a 1974 single:
"Power and the Glory", recorded with a fife and drum corps
"Here's to the State of Richard Nixon", a revision of "Here's to the State of Mississippi", taped live at Max's Kansas City
An acoustic version of "Crucifixion" recorded at Carnegie Hall on March 27, 1970, at the show that had produced Gunfight at Carnegie Hall
The three singles had not been available previously on any album.

As with many compilations, favoritism abounds on the album. Seven tracks from Ochs' third album and four from his first appear, while only one song each is included from his second and fifth albums. No tracks from Ochs' seventh album are included, and his remaining albums are represented by two or three songs apiece. With the exception of the 1997 box set, never again would Elektra material be released on A&M, or vice versa.

Track listing
All songs by Phil Ochs unless otherwise noted.

Side One
"I Ain't Marching Anymore" – 2:47
"One More Parade" (P. Ochs, Bob Gibson) – 3:00
"Draft Dodger Rag" – 2:07
"Here's to the State of Richard Nixon" – 2:19
"The Bells" (Edgar Allan Poe with musical interpretation by P. Ochs) – 3:00
"Bound for Glory" – 3:15
"Too Many Martyrs" (Ochs, Gibson) – 2:46
"There But for Fortune" – 2:35

Side Two
"I'm Gonna Say It Now" – 2:46
"Santo Domingo" – 3:48
"Changes" – 4:30
"Is There Anybody Here" – 3:17
"Love Me, I'm a Liberal" – 3:46
"When I'm Gone" – 3:51

Side Three
"Outside of a Small Circle of Friends" – 3:41
"Pleasures of the Harbor" – 4:59
"Tape from California" – 3:39
"Chords of Fame" – 3:32
"Crucifixion" – 7:40

Side Four
"The War Is Over" – 4:25
"Jim Dean of Indiana" – 5:02
"Power and the Glory" – 2:21
"Flower Lady" – 6:06
"No More Songs" – 4:33

Source material
Track 1 from the 1966 single.
Tracks 2, 5, 6 and 7 from All the News That's Fit to Sing (1964).
Track 3 from I Ain't Marching Anymore (1965).
Tracks 4 and 22 from the 1974 single.
Tracks 8, 9, 10, 11, 12, 13 and 14 from Phil Ochs in Concert (1966).
Tracks 15 and 23 from Pleasures of the Harbor (1967).
Tracks 16 and 17 from Gunfight at Carnegie Hall (1975).
Tracks 18, 21 and 24 from Greatest Hits (1970).
Track 19 previously unreleased (recorded 1970).
Track 20 from Tape from California (1968).

Personnel 
Phil Ochs – Guitar, Vocals

References

Phil Ochs compilation albums
1976 compilation albums
A&M Records compilation albums